Project Magic is a program, designed by David Copperfield, where teams of magicians and occupational therapists work together to teach sleight of hand to physically challenged patients to aid in their rehabilitation and help the patients build self-esteem. The tricks taught in Project Magic were designed to help improve dexterity, coordination, visual perception, spatial relationships, and cognitive skills, with specific magic tricks developed for varying disabilities.

Origin
When David Copperfield received a press clipping in a letter from a magician he had been corresponding with, he was surprised to learn from the photograph that the young man was in a wheelchair. "His self-image did not have a disability," said Copperfield. This led Copperfield to wonder if magic could help to recover patients and gain self-confidence.

In February 1982, Copperfield brought his idea to the Daniel Freeman Memorial Hospital in Inglewood, California, which was recognized by the National Association of Rehabilitation Facilities as the "outstanding rehabilitation center of 1981". The occupational therapy department quickly embraced the concept, realizing that it could offer other benefits beyond bolstering the patients' self-image. Copperfield began collaborating with Julie DeJean, the hospital's director of occupational therapy, to develop tricks that could be applied to treat various disabilities. The participants also gained self-confidence by being able to do things that others could not.

Structure
The Project Magic program was designed by David Copperfield, where teams of magicians and occupational therapists work together to teach sleight of hand to physically challenged patients to aid in their rehabilitation. The occupational therapists using Project Magic work in teams with local volunteer magicians. The magician first teaches the illusions to the therapists, then together, they instruct the patients on how to perform the illusions. The therapist then helps the patients to master the techniques involved during the following week. After a week, the magicians return and give on how to polish up the trick by using other techniques such as misdirection and the proper stage presence. "Project Magic is presently employed in hundreds of hospitals worldwide," comments Copperfield. "I am pleased  that the American Occupational Therapist Association has endorsed this program as being an authentic therapeutic tool."

Copperfield directly involved with Project Magic. He works directly with the patients and gives seminars to introduce and discuss his form of treatment. The tricks taught in Project Magic were designed to help improve dexterity, coordination, visual perception, spatial relationships, and cognitive skills. There are specific magic tricks developed for varying disabilities. It also helps the patients build self-esteem.

External links
 Project Magic

References

Medical and health organizations based in California
American magicians
Occupational therapy